Callan is a given name and surname of Irish and Scottish origin.

Callan may also refer to:

Places
 Callan (Parliament of Ireland constituency), a former constituency in the Irish House of Commons
 Callan, County Kilkenny, a town in Ireland
 Callan River, County Armagh, Northern Ireland
 Mount Callan, County Clare, Ireland
 Callan, a barangay in Pototan, Iloilo, Philippines

Other
 Callan (barony), a barony in County Kilkenny, Ireland
 Callan (film), a 1974 film version of the TV series
 Callan (TV series), a UK spy series, 1967–72
 Callan Data Systems, a 1980s U.S. computer manufacturer
 Camp Callan, a former U.S. army training center
 Clara Callan, a 2001 novel by Richard B. Wright
 USS General R. E. Callan (AP-139), a U.S. Navy transport ship

See also
 
 Calla (name)
 Callen (disambiguation)
 Calan (disambiguation)